The Erythrinidae are a family of fishes found in rivers and other freshwater habitats from Costa Rica south as far as Argentina. They are common and are caught with hooks by fishermen, partially because of their voracious behaviour. They are sometimes called trahiras (also spelled trairas) or tarariras.

The Erythrinidae include cylindrical fish with blunt heads, and prey on other fish. Some species can breathe air, enabling them to survive in water low in oxygen, and even to move over land between ponds.

Species
The 16 species are contained in three genera:
Erythrinus
Hoplerythrinus
Hoplias - giant trahiras

References

 Nelson, Joseph S. (2006). Fishes of the World. John Wiley & Sons, Inc.

External links

 
Fish of South America